Betty Asher (May 6, 1914 – 1994) was an American art collector and dealer.  An ardent supporter of Pop art and Contemporary art, her large collection of cups and saucers by artists was world-famous.

Biography 
Asher was born in Chicago on May 4, 1914. The family lived behind the drugstore. Asher attended a normal school (teacher training college) in Chicago for one year before beginning training to become a nurse at Michael Reese Hospital in Chicago.  She graduated as an RN and spent about four years in private nursing.

In 1939, she married Dr. Leonard Asher. They moved to Los Angeles in 1941. The couple had two children, Reina Asher (Allen) and Michael Asher (who would become a well known conceptual artist), and three granddaughters, Pamela, Debra, and Tara.

Aside from being a collector, she was curatorial assistant at the Los Angeles County Museum of Art for 13 years (1966–79), and co-founded and co-owned Asher-Faure Gallery with Patricia Faure from 1979-90.

Asher died at her home in Beverly Hills on May 11, 1994. Her papers were donated to the Getty Research Institute in 2010.

Notes

External links
Oral History Interview: Betty Asher (Archives of American Art)
Betty Asher Papers, Getty Research Institute

1914 births
American art collectors
Women art collectors
1994 deaths
Artists from Chicago
American nurses
American women nurses
Women art dealers
American art dealers
20th-century American women